Cloetta is a Swedish confectionery and nuts company. The company manufactures and sells local confectionery brands on its main markets Sweden, Finland, Norway, Denmark, Netherlands, Germany and the UK.

The company has 8 factories in five countries, and the head office is in Solna.

History
In 1862, Christoph Cloëtta (1836–1897) and his two brothers  Nutin Cloëtta and Bernard Cloëtta founded Danish chocolate manufacturer Brødrene Cloëttas steam chocolate factory.
In 1873, Nutin Cloëtta established a Swedish subsidiary in Malmö, Sweden and one subsidiary in 1896, in Oslo, Norway.

After several years of legal disputes between Cloetta Fazer's two major owners, the Svenfelt-Trotzig family company Malfors Promotor and the Finnish family-owned Karl Fazer, it was announced in June 2008 that Cloetta Fazer would be split up.  Cloetta became an independent company again in late 2008 and was listed on the Stockholm Stock Exchange on 8 December 2008. In December 2011, it was announced that Cloetta and Leaf would merge into one company.

Cloetta has seven factories in five countries. The two largest factories are in Levice, Slovakia, and Ljungsbro, Sweden.
The company is listed on the Stockholm stock exchange. In 2016, Cloetta finalized a deal to acquire pick & mix supplier Candyking, which operates in the United Kingdom and the Nordic countries. In 2017, Cloetta bought the bulk candy company Candyking.

Some of the brands owned by Cloetta are Läkerol, Cloetta, Candyking, Jenkki, Kexchoklad, Malaco, Sportlife and Red Band.

References

External links 

Food and drink companies of Sweden
Food and drink companies of Denmark
Manufacturing companies of Sweden
Companies established in 1862
Confectionery companies
Danish companies established in 1862
Companies listed on Nasdaq Stockholm
Companies based in Stockholm County